Salvia herbanica is a critically endangered perennial plant that is endemic to the Canary Islands, growing in the mountains of southern-central Fuerteventura, at  elevation. In  2004 there were only 212 known plants in the wild, in ten locations, with fewer than 50 plants in each location. Habitat for the plant continues to shrink due to predation by herbivores (domesticated goats and sheep and wild rabbits and  squirrels) . Less than 50 of the plants are safe from predation, with the rest of the plants in poor health.

The flowers grow on terminal spikes with 6-8 whorls, with a dark purple calyx holding the corolla which is violet with white spots.

Notes

herbanica
Endemic flora of the Canary Islands